Jean Witkowski (23 May 1895 – 24 May 1953), the son of Georges Martin Witkowski, was a French choral conductor and conductor.

Life 
Born in Vouziers, Witkowski studied music with his father, cello with Léonce Allard and piano with Blanche Selva. He began as a timpanist at the age of 13 in his father's orchestra, a position he held for 11 years. As a cellist, he was a member of several ensembles (Trillat Trio, Guichardon Quartet, Crinière Quartet).

He volunteered and was seriously wounded at the Battle of the Somme in 1916.

In January 1923, he made his debut as a choir conductor at the Schola Cantorum in Lyon, then on 24 November 1929 as a conductor. He participated in quartets and formed with violinist Hortense de Sampigny and pianist Ennemond Trillat the "Trillat trio" which toured in France and abroad. He took part in the premiered of works by many artists such as Vincent d'Indy, Adrien Rougier, Florent Schmitt, or his own father, Georges Martin Witkowski. He also brought to Lyon some of the most renowned interpreters of the time: Robert Casadesus, Zino Francescatti, Jacques Thibaud, Alfred Cortot, Yves Nat, Ninon Vallin, Ginette Neveu, Ennemond Trillat, Marguerite Long, Paul Tortelier, Samson François, etc. Florent Schmitt nicknamed him "the French Casals".

When his father died in 1943, he succeeded him as head of the Orchestre National de Lyon.

Witkowski died of pleurisy at age 54.

References

Bibliography 
 .
 .

External links 
 Tambourin (Harpsichord pieces in concert, 3rd Book) YouTube

1895 births
1953 deaths
People from Ardennes (department)
French male conductors (music)
French classical cellists
French male musicians
20th-century French conductors (music)
20th-century French male musicians
20th-century cellists